Daniel Yonnet (10 June 1933 – 9 November 2020) was a French literary critic, writer, and journalist. In 1982, he received the Prix Jean-Le-Duc alongside Pierre Schoendoerffer and Jean-François Chauvel for the film A Captain's Honor.

Yonnet was mobilized for the Algerian War, which inspired him to delve into journalism. He worked for Le Télégramme in Brest and Ouest-France. He became departmental director for Finistère with Ouest-France from 1973 to 1984 and director of the editorial staff in Cherbourg-Octeville. He also became a literary critic.

Yonnet was the author of several books on Brittany, including several in collaboration with photographer Michel Thersiquel. He was a member of the honorary committee of the International House of Poets and Writers Saint-Malo.

Daniel Yonnet died on 9 November 2020 at the age of 87.

Publications
Le Printemps du fossoyeur (1981)
Ballade pour une femme (1985)
La Marche des anges ou l'annonce volée (1987)
Le Diable et l'exorciste (1993)
Nos années de Breizh (1998)
Le Finistère des peintres (1999)
La Bretagne aimée des peintres Quimperlé-Pont-Aven-Concarneau (2001)
La Bretagne vue du ciel (2006)

References

1933 births
2020 deaths
French literary critics
French journalists